Fenoevo is a town and commune in Madagascar. It belongs to the district of Taolanaro, which is a part of Anosy Region. The population of the commune was estimated to be approximately 5,000 in 2001 commune census.

Only primary schooling is available. The majority 80% of the population of the commune are farmers, while an additional 10% receives their livelihood from raising livestock. The most important crop is rice, while other important products are coffee and cassava. Industry and services provide employment for 2% and 5% of the population, respectively. Additionally fishing employs 3% of the population.

References and notes 

Populated places in Anosy